Mitchell's worm lizard (Amphisbaena mitchelli) is a species of worm lizard in the family Amphisbaenidae. The species is endemic to Brazil.

Etymology
The specific name, mitchelli, is in honor of British zoologist Peter Chalmers Mitchell.

Geographic range
A. mitchelli is found in Brazil, in the states of Maranhão and Pará.

Reproduction
A. mitchelli is oviparous.

References

Further reading
Gans C (1963). "Notes on Amphisbaenids (Amphisbaenia, Reptilia). 7. Redescription and Redefinition of Amphisbaena mitchelli Procter and Amphisbaena sleveni Schmidt from the Middle and Lower Amazon, Brazil". American Museum Novitates (2127): 1-22.
Procter JB (1923). "On New and Rare Reptiles from South America". Proceedings of the Zoological Society of London 1923: 1061–1067. (Amphisbæna mitchelli, new species, p. 1065).

Amphisbaena (lizard)
Reptiles described in 1923
Taxa named by Joan Beauchamp Procter
Endemic fauna of Brazil
Reptiles of Brazil